The Aquarium de Lyon is a public aquarium located in the La Mulatière district of the city of Lyon, France, near the confluence of the Rhône and Saône rivers in the Rhône department. Like the Aqualand parks elsewhere in Europe, it belongs to the Spanish group Aspro-Ocio.

The largest aquarium is called "Fosse Aux Requins". It contains a false shipwreck in polyurethane resin (the iron would have rusted and the rust is toxic to fishes). Its glass is 23 centimetres thick to resist the water pressure.

References

External links

Aquaria in France
Buildings and structures in Lyon
Tourist attractions in Auvergne-Rhône-Alpes
Tourist attractions in Lyon
Aspro Parks attractions
Organizations based in Lyon